The Nehaj Fortress  is a fortress on the hill Nehaj in the town of Senj, Croatia.

The name Nehaj comes from the Croatian term Ne hajati , which means 'don't care'. In Croatian this fortress has also other names, which are: Kula Nehaj , what means Nehaj Tower, and Nehajgrad , what means Nehajtown.

This name was given to the hill and the Fortress by the Uskoks, who built on the top of this hill the Fortress for defensive purposes. They gave the hill and the Fortress such a name because they wanted to emphasize to the citizens of the town of Senj, and all of those that lived in the vicinity of the town of Senj that they should not care that someone will conquer this hill or the Fortress until they are there.

It was built by Croatian army general Ivan Lenković, a captain of the Uskoks, on the hill Nehaj. Finished in 1558, it was built on the remains of ruined churches, monasteries and houses which were situated outside of the walls of Senj. These buildings were scrapped since it was concluded that they would not survive anyway if they were outside the city walls, as the Ottomans would loot them or use them as housing during sieges. The fortress was mainly built to fight the Ottoman Empire, and to be used as a base for the Uskoks. The Uskoks (who built and inhabited the fort) were great enemies of the Ottomans, as they had previously taken another city called Klis, where the Uskoks used to reside. Before the fortress was built, Senj had been besieged three times, but none succeeded; after the fort was built, the fortress or Senj were not attacked again. However, the Uskoks were also known to be the enemies of the Venetians, as the Venetians were quite aggressive toward the Croatian coastal cities. The Venetians viewed them as pirates, since they would plunder and sink their ships. They were known to travel as far as Istria and plunder Venetian ships. In fact, the Venetians were so disturbed by the Uskok attacks that they had a war with Austria (which Senj was a part of at that time). One of the peace terms was the banishment of the Uskoks. The Emperor did banish the Uskoks and that was their end. However, during the hundred years that they were active they stood by their oath of vengeance towards all their enemies which they took when their former fortress of Klis was conquered by the Ottomans in 1537. The Uskoks and the Fortress successfully held the border and kept invaders away, as the fortress was never conquered or torn down. In 1592, a strong Ottoman army invaded Croatia hoping to capture Senj. Led by Telli Hasan Pasha, the beylerbey of Bosnia, the Ottomans managed to capture a number of Uskok settlements, killing and enslaving the population. However, the army was routed and dispersed in the following year. Austria was involved in war with the Ottomans and the Venetian admiral Giovanni Bembo blockaded Trieste and Rijeka (Fiume), where the pirates forwarded their booty for sale. They also erected two forts to command the passages from Senj to the open sea. In 1600, the Prince of Senj was Mickael Radic. The Duke Micheal Radic, appointed as Prince of Senj on 1 December 1600 by King Rudolf in Graz. Prince Radic was Prince of Senj. Radic family is a Native noble family from Lika region; members of the family were Uskok military leaders at the headquarters in Senj. 

There are five towers on top of the Fortress, and eleven large cannon openings along the walls. Inside the Fortress, there are displays of cannons and other household items, as well as a collection of costumes and weapons of the Uskoks of Senj. There is also an annual medieval festival that is held in Senj, and an important part of it is when the "Uskoks" march up to the fortress on horseback. There are also crafting workshops and other medieval themed attractions around the fortress at this time; as well as a detailed overview of its history.

Today, the fortress serves primarily as a museum. With exhibits of weapons, clothing, drawings and models of various things from the time when the fortress was actively used. Virtually all regions of the fort are accessible. Including the toilet which dangles over the edge, but that is not available for use today.

Gallery

See also
 Uskoks
 Nehaj
 Senj
 The Outsiders of Uskoken Castle

References

Footnotes

Bibliography

External links
 The official web-site of the Nehaj Fortress 

Infrastructure completed in 1558
Forts in Croatia
Buildings and structures in Lika-Senj County
1558 establishments in Europe
Tourist attractions in Lika-Senj County